Ina Zhupa (born 20 June 1987 Tirana) is an Albanian political scientist who studies Democratization and Values of Albanian Society.

Life 
She studied for the Master of Political Communication offered by La Sapienza University in collaboration with the University of Tirana. She graduated from the Master of Science in Political and Bachelor Theory in Politics and Governance at the University of Tirana. 

Currently, she is a lecturer in the Department of Political Sciences and International Relations at the University of Tirana, with experience in teaching at state and private universities, where she has also served as Dean of Students and Manager of Career Office, with experience working with various national and international projects, as well as in state departments. Her research is focused on issues related to European integration, the values of Albanian society, the process of democratization, international relations theories, approaches and models on conflict, the challenges of transition.

She has conducted field research to measure reality and develop it according to social science methods, being the author of a study book on voting behavior. She participated in national and international conferences, and has published scientific articles in known scientific journals at home and abroad.

Zupa is active in political life, currently holds the position of the Spokeswoman in the Democratic Party of Albania, at the same time National Coordinator and Member of the National Council in the Democratic Party of Albania.
Zhupa is part of team seriously working on denigration process of Democratic Party of Albania.

References

External links 
 
 

1987 births
Albanian political scientists
Women political scientists
Living people
University of Tirana alumni
Sapienza University of Rome alumni
Democratic Party of Albania politicians
21st-century Albanian women politicians
21st-century Albanian politicians
Academic staff of the University of Tirana